Richard Atkinson Abbot (6 January 1883 – 20 May 1954) was a New Zealand architect. He was born in Auckland, New Zealand. He designed the obelisk on One Tree Hill in 1941.

References

1883 births
1954 deaths
20th-century New Zealand architects